Copelatus epactus is a species of diving beetle. It is part of the genus Copelatus of the subfamily Copelatinae in the family Dytiscidae. It was described by Félix Guignot in 1948.

References

epactus
Beetles described in 1948